Albert Ernest Joscelyne (8 April 1866 – 3 May 1945) was an English Anglican clergyman who served as Bishop Coadjutor of Jamaica from 1905 to 1913.

Life
Joscelyne was born in Chelmsford, Essex and educated at Merchant Taylors' School and Jesus College, Oxford. After his ordination, he was a curate at St George's-in-the-East, London for five years, then became vicar of St George's, Millom (1895–1903) and vicar of St Peter's Islington (1903–1905). He was Bishop Coadjutor of Jamaica (1905–1913), and then served as a priest in the Diocese of Salisbury, becoming Prebendary of Yatesbury and Archdeacon of Sherborne (1919–1941).

He died at Donhead St Mary on 3 May 1945 at the age of 79.

References

1866 births
1945 deaths
Alumni of Jesus College, Oxford
20th-century Anglican bishops in the Caribbean
Archdeacons of Sherborne
Anglican bishops of Jamaica